Arthur Bauchet (born 10 October 2000) is a French para-alpine skier.

Career
He represented France at the 2018 Winter Paralympics and won four silver medals .

He competed at the 2021 World Para Snow Sports Championships and won gold medals in the super combined and slalom standing events, and silver medals in the downhill and giant slalom standing events.

He represented France at the 2022 Winter Paralympics and won three gold medals and a bronze medal.

References

External links 
 
 

2000 births
Living people
French male alpine skiers
Alpine skiers at the 2018 Winter Paralympics
Alpine skiers at the 2022 Winter Paralympics
Medalists at the 2018 Winter Paralympics
Medalists at the 2022 Winter Paralympics
Paralympic alpine skiers of France
Paralympic gold medalists for France
Paralympic silver medalists for France
Paralympic bronze medalists for France
Paralympic medalists in alpine skiing
21st-century French people